A hand scraper is a single-edged tool used to scrape metal or other materials from a surface. This may be required where a surface needs to be trued, corrected for fit to a mating part, needs to retain oil (usually on a freshly ground surface), or to give a decorative finish.

Surface plates were traditionally made by scraping. Three raw (plates that have been `seasoned` or residual stress relieved and received suitable surface treatments, but unfinished) cast surface plates, a flat scraper (as pictured at the top of the image) and a quantity of bearing blue (or red lead) were all that was required in the way of tools.

The scraper in the center of the image is a three corner scraper and is typically used to deburr holes or the internal surface of bush type bearings. Bushes are typically made from bronze or a white metal.

The scraper pictured at the bottom is a curved scraper. It has a slight curve in its profile and is also suitable for bush bearings, typically the longer ones.

One advantage of scraping is the ability to take the tool to the workpiece, this can be useful when the workpiece weighs several tons and is difficult to move.

It is done by using a precision surface such as a surface plate or a straight edge as a standard (a straight edge in this context is not a ruler; it is a miniature surface plate of extreme accuracy). The standard is coated with a very thin coating of a material such as Prussian blue. The work piece and standard are touched together by gravity alone and the high spots on the work piece will be colored by the dye on the standard. These high spots are scraped off and the process repeated until there is an even spread of high spots which total about 60%  or more of the surface area. Coarse scraping gives a resulting surface with 5-10 points per square inch while fine scraping yields 24-36 points per square inch. If desired the surface can then be “Frosted”. A surface prepared in this way is superior in overall accuracy to any prepared by machining or grinding operations, although lapping can equal or exceed it over small distances.  Grinding and machining stresses the metal thermally and mechanically, scraping and lapping do not. 

Scraping is the only method for producing an original set of flat surfaces from which one can transfer that accuracy through to other surfaces by means of grinding. Lapping and grinding do not achieve the long distance flatness scraping can, as they act on the entire surface rather than local high or low spots. 

With precision ground surfaces, any oil film applied to the surface will lack the means to adhere to the surface, especially between two mating parts of exceptional finish.  The oil film will be swept away leaving nothing but bare metal and the risk of seizure. Carefully scraping the surface will leave the original high quality surface intact, but provide many shallow depressions where the oil film can maintain its depth and surface tension. When scraping is used for this purpose it is more accurately called "frosting", "spotting" or "flaking" as opposed to fully scraping an accurate surface. Typically a scraped surface is scraped to highly accurate flatness and then "frosting" is applied over it for oil retention. It is claimed to stop the so-called "stick-slip" phenomenon where a machine member might move in a jerky fashion rather than moving smoothly, allowing vibration and chatter. 
Such frosting will definitely increase oil retention but will also drastically reduce bearing area and capacity.  There is no possibility of achieving hydrodynamic bearing performance on normal sliding machine ways.  The velocity is far too low. Most of the time the ways will run under boundary lubrication conditions while at the highest speeds it might achieve mixed lubrication. This makes oil additives important in ways lubrication. However, this view is somewhat contradicted by the external link "Scraping methods".  

Hand scraping leaves a distinctive pattern on the surface that is scraped. This can be suggestive of a high level of precision in the ways, however, sometimes a surface can be marked to appear hand scraped, but it is really just a superficial surface treatment designed to give the impression of a scraped machine way.

Hand scraping can also be done by a power tool that has a reciprocating blade and is usually adjustable for stroke length and number of strokes per minute.

References

Bibliography
 . Moore's monograph is a seminal classic of the principles of machine tool design and construction that yield the highest possible accuracy and precision in machine tools. The Moore firm epitomizes the art and science of the tool and die maker.

External links
Scraping methods.
Hand Scraping Class.
History of metal scraping.

Metalworking hand tools